Salona is an unincorporated community in Lamar Township, Clinton County, Pennsylvania, United States. It was named for the Greek city of Thessalonica.

References

Unincorporated communities in Clinton County, Pennsylvania
Unincorporated communities in Pennsylvania